ARA Veinticinco de Mayo was a cruiser which served in the Argentine Navy. The English translation of the name is May 25, which is the date of Argentina's May Revolution in 1810.

History and design 
Three vessels were to be produced, but in the end, only 25 de Mayo and her sister ship  were acquired, both in 1931.

These ships were unusual in several ways. First, they carried 7.5-inch guns, only the third class of warship to do so (the British Hawkins-class cruisers of World War I being another; a more typical main armament for heavy cruisers is 8-inch guns). Also, like the Italian  and other Italian-built warships of the era they carried their floatplanes under the foredeck and launched them from a fixed catapult over the bows.

See also 
 List of cruisers
 List of ships of the Argentine Navy

References 
 David Miller, Illustrated Directory of Warships - from 1860 to the present day. (Salamander Books, London, 2001)
 M. J. Whitley, Cruisers of World War II, An International Encyclopedia (1995) Arms and Armour Press

Further reading 
 Burzaco, Ricardo. Acorazados y Cruceros de la Armada Argentina. Eugenio B, Buenos Aires, 1997.  (in Spanish)
 Arguindeguy, Pablo. Apuntes sobre los buques de la Armada Argentina (1810-1970). Comando en Jefe de la Armada, Buenos aires, 1972. ISBN n/d  (in Spanish)

See also 
 List of ships of the Argentine Navy

External links 
 History of argentinian cruisers, at HISTARMAR (in Spanish)

 

Veinticinco de Mayo-class cruisers
Ships built in Livorno
1929 ships
World War II cruisers of Argentina